Harringay railway station is in Harringay in the London Borough of Haringey, north London. It opened on 1 May 1885.

Harringay is managed and served by Great Northern. It is a short distance from Harringay Green Lanes railway station on the London Overground network.

History
A formal agreement to build a station at Harringay was made between the British Land Company and the Great Northern Railway in April 1884. The Land Company needed the station to serve housing it was building to the east of the railway line on the site of Harringay House, so it contributed £3,500 to the cost and agreed to bear the working costs of the station for an initial period. Contracts to build the station (including the footbridge) and a road bridge over the Tottenham & Hampstead line went to S.W. Pattinson of Ruskington for £8,000 and £3,999 respectively in August the same year.

The station was constructed with an up platform as an island serving the up main and up slow, and a single-sided down platform serving the down slow only. A  was constructed to give access to the station. It stretched from a station approach road off Wightman Road to the west side of the cutting, where Quernmore Road would eventually be built some fifteen years later. A booking office was built on the footbridge above the platforms.

The station opened to passenger traffic on 1 May 1885 with a staff complement of a station master, two assistant clerks, two ticket collectors, and three porters. Although it had been agreed that the station would be named Harringay Park, the GNR public timetable from May 1885 shows that station was in fact named Harringay from the outset. A goods yard was built to the east of the line, but the exact date it opened for public traffic is not recorded.

In 1900 a second down slow passenger line was added and the down platform was made an island and widened along its entire length.

The 1885 booking office building suffered fire damage in the 1960s and had been almost entirely removed by 1969. It was replaced by a small timber shack, which still serves as a ticket office today.

The station was renamed Harringay West on 18 June 1951, but reverted to Harringay on 27 May 1971.

In 1975 the platform layout was altered with the west sides of both acting as single sided platforms. A replacement waiting room/canopy block was provided on each.

Since 1976 under British Rail only the central part of the footbridge, and the girders built to carry the old booking office building, remain from the 1885 station structure.

Under plans approved in 1897, the station was to be served by the Great Northern and Strand Railway (GN&SR), a tube railway supported by the GNR which would have run underground beneath the GNR's tracks from Alexandra Palace to Finsbury Park and then into central London. The GN&SR stations on each side would have been the same as the main line stations. The GN&SR route and stations north of Finsbury Park were cancelled in 1902 when the GN&SR was taken over by Charles Yerkes' consortium, which planned to merge it with the Brompton & Piccadilly Circus Railway to form the Great Northern, Piccadilly and Brompton Railway from Finsbury Park to Hammersmith (now part of the London Underground's Piccadilly line).

Services

All services at Harringay are operated by Great Northern using  EMUs.

The typical off-peak service in trains per hour is:
 4 tph to 
 2 tph to  via 
 2 tph to 

During the peak hours, the station is served by an additional half-hourly service between Moorgate and Hertford North, and the service between Moorgate and Welwyn Garden City is increased to 4 tph.

Connections
London Buses route W5 serves the station.

Infrastructure

Trains calling at Harringay use the low-speed rail tracks in front of the platforms; there are five more tracks passing through and around the vicinity of the station. Two of these are used for high-speed London North Eastern Railway, Hull Trains, Grand Central and other Great Northern services, and the other three are used for freight services. Occasionally, when these lines are busy, the low-speed tracks are used for the faster services.

A rail link between the East Coast Main Line and the Gospel Oak to Barking line branches off from the former at the southern end of the station.

During the week, trains use dual-voltage Class 717 EMUs following the withdrawal of  EMUs.

In popular culture

A supersized ticket stub, featuring the words 'Harringay West' (and Kings Cross), features prominently in the background of a promotional film of The Beatles' Ticket To Ride, filmed on 23 November 1965 at Twickenham Film Studios.

The station is used as a location in the 2009 film London River.

References 

Jowett, Alan (2000). Jowett's Nationalised Railway Atlas (1st ed.). Penryn, Cornwall: Atlantic Transport Publishers.

External links 

 Local Bus Map
 National Rail
 Google maps view of western entrance to station bridge from Quernmore Road
 Harringay Online's Harringay Timeline
 Pictures of the station and its environs on the Harringay Flickr group

Railway stations in the London Borough of Haringey
Former Great Northern Railway stations
Railway stations in Great Britain opened in 1885
Railway stations served by Govia Thameslink Railway
Proposed London Underground stations
Unbuilt Great Northern, Piccadilly and Brompton Railway stations
Railway station